Bluff Creek is an unincorporated community in East Feliciana Parish, Louisiana, United States.

Notes

Unincorporated communities in East Feliciana Parish, Louisiana
Unincorporated communities in Louisiana